Lough Mourne is a freshwater lake in the northwest of Ireland. It is located in County Donegal, near the border with County Tyrone.

Geography and hydrology
The lake serves as a reservoir for Donegal Town. The Mourne Beg River flows out of the southern end of the lough, while the Burn Daurnett flows out of the north-eastern end of the lough. The Red Burn (also known as the Sruhanderg) flows into the western side of the lough.

Natural history
Fish species in Lough Mourne include roach, pike, brown trout and the critically endangered European eel. The southwestern shore of Lough Mourne forms part of the Croaghonagh Bog Special Area of Conservation. The site provides supports for a range of wildlife species including important bird species.

See also
List of loughs in Ireland

References

Mourne